SmileTV is a range of British television channels which launched on digital terrestrial television (Freeview) channel 37 on 29 April 2006. It was carried on multiplex C, and timeshared with Dave. Initially the channel broadcast between 1am and 5am, but moved to 3am and 7am from 28 September 2007. On 20 August 2009, SmileTV ceased broadcasting and was replaced with SmileTV3, which still continues to broadcast to this day.

Programming
From the launch of SmileTV until 1 July 2006, Quizworld was shown in the 1 am to 4 am timeslot. Quizworld was a premium rate telephone quiz service. An audio version of Quizworld was also broadcast on Top Up TV Active intermittently outside of SmileTV's broadcast hours. The audio on was accompanied by an on-screen MHEG graphic of the quiz. A MHEG graphic was used as during the daytime and evening Top Up TV had no space on the platform for an additional videostream.

Later Quizworld was replaced by two shows, Party People from 1-4am and SumoTV from 4-5am. By the time the channel closed, the entirety of the channel's output was a premium rate telephone chat-line service by the name of Party Girls.

SmileTV2
SmileTV2 was a sister channel to the main SmileTV, and first appeared on Freeview channel 46 on 8 September 2008 - broadcasting Party Girls and Life Coach TV. After a few months, Life Coach TV was replaced with Psychic TV. The channel also aired daytime chat show, The Chat and Smile & Date. In February 2009, SmileTV2 dropped all mentioned programming in favour of Bingo on the Box: Live. On 15 March 2009, SmileTV2 ceased broadcasting. However, the channel relaunched in May, timesharing with Ideal World - broadcasting Babestation daily between 12 midnight and 5 am, but later closed permanently, only to relaunch again in August 2009.

The channel closed on May 13, 2020, following changes made to the Channel 4 channels 4Music & 4seven, as well as Together TV, which all temporarily broadcast from 10pm to 7am until June 2 on Freeview.

SmileTV3
After the original SmileTV closed in August 2009, a channel called SmileTV3 launched. Currently the channel broadcasts Babestation from 10pm to 6am.

References

External links
 

British pornographic television channels
Cellcast
Adult chat (television)
Television channels and stations established in 2006